Elvira Vigna (29 September 1947 – 10 July 2017) was a Brazilian writer, illustrator and journalist.

Born in Rio de Janeiro and raised in São Paulo, she graduated in literature at the University of Nancy in 1974 and a master's degree at the Federal University of Rio de Janeiro. She wrote for newspapers such as O Globo and O Estado de S. Paulo  and edited the literary magazine A Pomba.

She wrote and illustrated children's books in the beginning of her career, moving to novels later. Vigna's works won literary prizes such as the Jabuti Prize, Machado de Assis and Oceanos.

Vigna died on 10 July 2017 in São Paulo from cancer, aged 69.

Bibliography

Novels
 1988 – Sete anos e um dia
 1997 – O assassinato de Bebê Martê 
 1998 – Às seis em ponto.
 2002 – Coisas que os homens não entendem 
 2006 – Deixei ele lá e vim 
 2010 – Por Escrito
 2012 – O que deu pra fazer em matéria de história de amor 
 2016–  Como se estivéssemos em palimpsesto de putas

Children's books 
 1971–1983 Asdrúbal series:
 A breve história de Asdrúbal, o Terrível;
  A verdadeira história de Asdrúbal, o Terrível; 
 Asdrúbal no Museu; 
 O triste fim de Asdrúbal, o Terrível.
 1978 – Viviam como gato e cachorro
 1979 – Lã de umbigo
 1982 – Uma história pelo meio
 1983 – A pontinha menorzinha do enfeitinho do fim do cabo de uma colherzinha de café
 1996 – Mônica e Macarra
 2001 – O jogo dos limites.
 2013 – Vitória Valentina

References

External links

 Author's website

1947 births
2017 deaths
Brazilian children's writers
Brazilian women children's writers
Brazilian children's book illustrators
Brazilian illustrators
Brazilian women illustrators
20th-century Brazilian novelists
Brazilian people of Italian descent
Brazilian women novelists
Writers from Rio de Janeiro (city)
Deaths from cancer in São Paulo (state)
20th-century Brazilian women writers
21st-century Brazilian novelists
21st-century Brazilian women writers